Sports Illustrated Kids (SI Kids, trademarked Sports Illustrated KIDS, sometimes Sports Illustrated for Kids) is a monthly spin-off of the weekly American sports magazine Sports Illustrated. SI Kids was launched in January 1989 and includes sports coverage with less vocabulary and more emphasis on humor. The magazine's secondary purpose is to market sports to children.

The first issue featured Naismith Basketball Hall of Fame member and former Chicago Bulls guard Michael Jordan on the cover.

Sports Illustrated Teen 
Sports Illustrated Teen (SI Teen, trademarked Sports Illustrated TEEN, sometimes Sports Illustrated TEEN Edition) was a bound multiple-page insert within regular monthly issues of SI Kids, written for the older readers of the children's magazine. Its contents featured more statistics, predictions, and in-depth looks at both team-based and extreme sports. Sports Illustrated Teen first appeared in the January 2004 issue, being published until it was cancelled in the March 2010 issue and was replaced with a selected article from Sports Illustrated.

Partnership with Topps
In March 2006, the Topps company and Sports Illustrated Kids announced a marketing alliance to increase the overall awareness of trading card collecting among kids. The magazine advertises the inclusion of sports cards within every issue.

Magazine contents
Monthly features include comics, humorous captions of athletics photos, child reporters, and player interviews.

The magazine's recurring mascot is Buzz Beamer, a buzz-cut blond-haired Caucasian boy always in dark glasses. He stars in most of the comics in which he plays a variety of sports and also appeared in several flash cartoons on the official website. Buzz is created and drawn by award-winning cartoonist Bill Hinds.

Other works have been published under the magazine title including video games, a television show, and books (such as a sports pop-up book).

The December edition of the magazine features the SportsKid of the Year.

Each issue features a poster that can be torn out of the issue.

Cover history

Most covers by athlete, 1989–2011

Spot Preview Editions 1989–2011

Special Editions 1989–2011

Awards and recognition

Won the "Distinguished Achievement for Excellence in Educational Publishing" award 11 times
Won the "Parents' Choice Magazine Award" 7 times

See also
 SportsKid of the Year
 Sports Illustrated
 Sports Illustrated Almanac
 Sports Illustrated Women
 Faces in the Crowd (Sports Illustrated)

References

External links
 
 Sports Illustrated Kids Teacher's web site
 Topps and SI Kids announce a partnership

Children's magazines published in the United States
Monthly magazines published in the United States
Sports magazines published in the United States
Magazines established in 1989
Magazines formerly owned by Meredith Corporation
Magazines published in New York City
Kids